Sticthippus californicus, the fastigial range grasshopper, is a species of band-winged grasshopper in the family Acrididae. It is found in western North America.

References

External links

 

Oedipodinae